Acleris albopterana is a species of moth of the family Tortricidae. It is found in China (Qinghai).

The wingspan is 18.5–21.4 mm. The basal half of the costa is white and the apical half is brown with greyish-brown scales. Adults have been recorded on wing in August and October.

References

Moths described in 1993
albopterana
Moths of Asia